Mark Robertson may refer to:

 Mark Robertson (soccer) (born 1977), Australian soccer player
 Mark Robertson (bassist), American musician and record producer
 Mark Robertson (rugby union) (born 1984), Scottish rugby union player

See also
 Mark Roberts (disambiguation)